Borj-e Ziad (also Romanized as Borj-e Zīād, Borj-e Zeyād, Borj Zīād, and Burj-i-Ziād) is a village in Alqurat Rural District, in the Central District of Birjand County, South Khorasan Province, Iran. At the 2006 census, its population was 119, in 36 families.

References 

Populated places in Birjand County